The 2008 Indiana Hoosiers football team represented the Indiana University Bloomington during the 2008 NCAA Division I FBS football season. The Hoosiers played their home games at Memorial Stadium in Bloomington, Indiana. The team was led by Bill Lynch in his second year as head coach.

Schedule

Game summaries

Western Kentucky

Murray State

Ball State

Michigan State

Minnesota

Iowa

Illinois

Northwestern

Central Michigan

Wisconsin

Penn State

Penn State overcame a sluggish first half to preserve their perfect record over the Hoosiers. After going up 7-0, Indiana scored on the next drive to tie it at 7-7, but Kevin Kelly kicked a field goal right before halftime to give the Lions a 10-7 lead at halftime. In the third quarter, Penn State scored two more touchdowns and a field goal to put it at 27-7. Penn State scored the final touchdown of the game in the 4th quarter. Penn State's defense held the Hoosiers to six first downs and forced an interception. The offense struggled at times, however, and turned the ball over three times.

Purdue

Rankings

Statistics

Team

Scores by quarter

Offense

Rushing

Passing

Receiving

Defense

Special teams

References

Indiana
Indiana Hoosiers football seasons
Indiana Hoosiers football